Traian or Trajan can refer to:

People
 Traianus, or Trajan, the 13th Roman emperor.
 Marcus Ulpius Traianus, a senator and father to Emperor Trajan
 Traianus Hadrianus, or Hadrian, the 14th Roman emperor and successor to Trajan
 Trajan's Column, a monument raised in his honor.
 Trajan (typeface), a font made by Carol Twombly based on the inscriptions on the column.
Trajan Decius, the 34th Roman emperor
 Traianus (magister peditum), Roman general in the Gothic War (376–382)
 Trajan the Patrician, Byzantine historian
Traian Băsescu, President of Romania from 2004 to 2014
Traian Bratu, Romanian Germanist
Traian Brăileanu, Romanian sociologist and politician
Traian Cihărean, Romanian weightlifter
Traian Cocorăscu, Romanian general
Traian T. Coșovei, Romanian poet
Traian Crișan, Romanian Greek-Catholic bishop
Traian Demetrescu, Romanian poet
Traian Herseni, Romanian social scientist
Traian Ichim, Romanian chess player
Traian Ionescu, Romanian footballer
Traian Iordache, Romanian footballer
Traian Ivănescu, Romanian footballer
Traian Lalescu, Romanian mathematician
Traian Moșoiu, Romanian general
Traian Neagu, Romanian canoeist
Traian Nițescu, Romanian engineer and bobsledder
Traian Popovici, Romanian lawyer
Traian Stoianovich, Serbian-Canadian historian
Traian Săvulescu, Romanian biologist 
Traian Trestioreanu, Romanian painter
Traian Vuia, Romanian aviator
Trajan Langdon, American professional basketball player

Places in Romania
 Traian, Bacău, a commune in Bacău County
 Traian, Brăila, a commune in Brăila County
 Traian, Ialomița, a commune in Ialomiţa County
 Traian, Olt, a commune in Olt County
 Traian, Teleorman, a commune in Teleorman County
 Traian, a village in Săcele Commune, Constanţa County
 Traian, a village in Braniştea Commune, Galaţi County
 Traian, a village in Bivolari Commune, Iaşi County
 Traian, a village in Săbăoani Commune, Neamţ County
 Traian, a village in Zănești Commune, Neamţ County
 Traian, a village in Doba Commune, Satu Mare County
 Traian, a village in Cerna Commune, Tulcea County
 Traian, a district in the town of Vânju Mare, Mehedinţi County

Other uses
 Trajan (typeface), a typeface emulating Roman square capitals
 Trajan (board game)